S. maxima may refer to:

 Sagina maxima, a plant native to western North America
 Sarangesa maxima, an African butterfly
 Shorea maxima, a plant endemic to Malaysia
 Solandra maxima, a vine endemic to Central America
 Sterna maxima, a New World tern